Javiera Belén Gómez Barrera (born 2002) is a Chilean chess player. She was awarded the title of Woman International Master title by FIDE in 2017.

Career
She won the Women's Chilean Chess Championship in 2020.

She has represented Chile in the Chess Olympiad twice; in 2016 (where she scored 6½/10 on board two) and 2018.

She qualified for the Women's Chess World Cup 2021, where she was defeated 1½-½ by Irine Kharisma Sukandar in the first round.

References

External links
 

Javiera Belén Gómez Barrera chess games at 365Chess.com

2002 births
Living people
Chilean female chess players
Chess Olympiad competitors
Place of birth missing (living people)